Zhongjianichthys rostratus is an extinct basal chordate that lived in the Cambrian period, approximately 518 million years ago. It is sometimes regarded as an early fish, and therefore as one of the first vertebrates. Zhongjianichthys is named after Zhongjian in China.

Physical characteristics 
The eyes are located behind the antero-dorsal lobe and the mouth apparently did not have a jaw. It lacked scales, and had a thick skin. It is known to have had a thicker skin than other chordates at that time because, unlike Myllokunmingia, no impressions of its myomeres have been found. The ventral fin is low in height, and runs much of the body's length.

Although Zhonjianichthys appears more advanced than its relatives due to the back-positioned eyes and the thicker skin, this may be convergent evolution and it may not, therefore, be particularly closely related to the ancestors of modern chordates.

Ecology 
Zhongjianichthys' reduced fins may indicate that it was mainly bottom-dwelling and did not swim much. This could have been a factor in its evolution of thicker skin, as protection from predators.

Locations 
Zhongjianichthys specimens have been found in the early Cambrian Maotianshan shales of China.

Notes

References

Maotianshan shales fossils
Prehistoric jawless fish genera
Cambrian fish
Fossil taxa described in 2003

Cambrian chordates
Cambrian genus extinctions